Deh-e Aqa (also Romanized as Deh-e Āqā; also known as Āgha and Āqā) is a village in Firuzabad Rural District, Firuzabad District, Selseleh County, Lorestan Province, Iran. At the 2006 census, its population was 397, in 81 families.

References 

Towns and villages in Selseleh County